Dhal Singh Bisen (born 14 May 1952) is an Indian politician. He was elected to the Lok Sabha, lower house of the Parliament of India from Balaghat, Madhya Pradesh in the 2019 Indian general election as member of the Bharatiya Janata Party. Dhalsingh Bisen has been Cabinet Minister in Government of Madhya Pradesh during 2003 till 2005. He has been elected as Member of Legislative Assembly Madhya Pradesh during 1990, 1993, 1998, 2003. 
Served as Chairman 4th State Finance Commission, Government of Madhya Pradesh during 2011 till 2013.
..

References

External links
  Official biographical sketch in Parliament of India website

India MPs 2019–present
Lok Sabha members from Madhya Pradesh
Living people
Bharatiya Janata Party politicians from Madhya Pradesh
People from Balaghat
1952 births